The men's 109 kg competition at the 2019 World Weightlifting Championships was held on 25 and 26 September 2019.

Schedule

Medalists

Records

Results

New records

References

Results 

Men's 98 kg